Coleopterology (from Coleoptera and Greek , -logia) is the scientific study of beetles, a branch of entomology. Practitioners are termed coleopterists and form groups of amateurs and professionals for business and pleasure. Among these is The Coleopterists Society, an international organization based in the United States.

Journals 
Research in this field is often published in peer-reviewed journals specific to the field of coleopterology, though journals dealing with general entomology also publish many papers on various aspects of beetle biology. Some of the journals specific to beetle research are:
 The Coleopterist (United Kingdom beetle fauna)
 The Coleopterists Bulletin (published by The Coleopterists Society)
 Elytron (published by the European Association of Coleopterology)

Literature
 
 . 
 
 .
 KW Harde, F. Severa: The Cosmos Beetle leader Franckh, Stuttgart, 1981.  .
 Wolfgang Willner: Pocket Dictionary of beetles of Central Europe Source & Meier, Wiebelsheim 2013.  .

See also
 List of coleopterists

References

External links
 The Coleopterist – includes a biographical dictionary of British coleopterists
 Scarab Workers World Directory
 German Coleopterists
 ZinRu Gouillard J. 2004. Histoire des entomologistes français (1750–1950). Édition entièrement revue et augmentée. Paris, Société Nouvelle des Éditions Boubée. 288 pp.
High definition portraits from Russia

 
Subfields of entomology